Shibin El Kom (colloquially shortened to Shibin) is a city in Egypt's Nile Delta, and the capital of the Monufia Governorate.

Etymology 
The city was previously known as Shaybin as-Ssarya the first part of which Ramzi connects to  ʾašyab "grey-coloured, old". It appears to be a translation of  akin to Shaybin al-Qasr, modern Shibin el-Qanatir, and possibly points out that Shibin el Kom used to be one of the Roman military camps in Lower Egypt.

Facilities
While the city is not a new one, its infrastructure is being modernized. The most important central and local government offices are located in the city, as well as the main branches of Menoufia University. The city has several public and private schools, hospitals, a large stadium, a regional office of Telecom Egypt, organized trade unions, athletic teams, political parties and social organizations and a chamber of commerce.

Climate 

Shibin's climate is classified by Köppen-Geiger climate classification system as hot desert (BWh), as the rest of Egypt.

The highest record temperature was  recorded on June 7, 1961, while the lowest record temperature was  recorded on January 23, 1996.

Museums 
Denshway Museum

See also
 List of cities and towns in Egypt

References 

Governorate capitals in Egypt
Populated places in Monufia Governorate
Cities in Egypt